The collège-lycée Jean-Baptiste-Say is a French public school built in 1895, operating as a collège and lycée as well as offering preparatory classes. It is located at 11 bis, rue d'Auteuil in Paris, in the 16th arrondissement of Paris and bears the name of French classical economist Jean-Baptiste Say (1767–1832). It is often known as JBS, and its students as "Sayens". The lycée is served by the Métro stations Michel-Ange – Auteuil (Paris Métro) and Église d'Auteuil (Paris Métro). In 2016, it was named best public lycée in France by the newspaper Le Monde ahead of Lycée Henri IV.

Architecture 

Part of the building at 11 bis rue d'Auteuil is classed as a Monument historique, by decree of 19 October 1928. The protection covers one of the façades of the building, as well as the interior of two rooms. Since 1954, most of the rooms of the lycée have been named in honour of illustrious people, including alumni who were members of the French Resistance, great scientists, and other famous people.

The lycée has three playgrounds and a small square, as well as an amphitheatre, a "courtyard", and an "honour pavilion", as well as classrooms (numbered 1 to 77). In addition, for a number of years there has been a prefabricated building in the centre of one of the courtyards, containing six classrooms (B1 to B6).

Results

Baccalauréat 

In 2015, the lycée was ranked 29th out of 109 at départemental level in terms of teaching quality, and 255th at national level. The ranking was based on three criteria: the level of bac results, the proportion of students who obtain their baccalauréat results having spent the last two years at the establishment, and added value (calculated based on the social origin of the students, their age, and their national diploma results).

Preparatory classes 

The lycée Jean-Baptiste-Say offers three scientific preparatory classes : PSI, PT, BCPST.

In 2017, L'Étudiant gave the following results for the courses of 2016 :

List of headteachers 

 1875–1880 : M. Marguerin (director)
 1880–1888 : M. Coutant (director)
 1888–1909 : M. Lévêque (director)
 1909–1915 : M. Boitel (director)
 1915–1927 : M. Haudié (director)
 1927–1940 : M. Laudet (director)
 1940–1941 : M. Place (director)
 1941–1944 : M. Béjean (principal)
 1944–1952 : M. Place (principal)
 1952–1954 : M. Place
 1954–1988 : M. Laye
 1988–1994 : Madame Marceau
 1995–2002 : Anny Duchêne – Forestier
 2002–2008 : Gérard Patenotte
 2008–2013 : Jacqueline Marguin-Durand
 2013–2016 : Sylvain Gressot
 Since 2016 : Marie-Claude Puigdemont – Proust

Alumni 

 Pierre Bézier, engineer
 Thomas Gomart, historian
 Pierre Lafue, teacher and writer
 Yvon Palamour, Breton cabinetmaker, luthier, musician
 Laure Saint-Raymond, mathematician
 Jean-François Revel, philosopher and essayist
 Georges Normandy, writer and literary critic

The lycée in cinema and television 

 1978 : Le Pion
 1994–2006 : Madame le Proviseur
 1980 : Au bon beurre, telefilm by Édouard Molinaro (lycée in which Léon Lécuyer teaches after the war)
 1995 : Les allumettes suédoises, trilogy of telefilms, after the eponymous novel by Robert Sabatier
 2006 : Paris 2011, La Grande Inondation, docu-fiction by Bruno-Victor Pujebet 
 2007 : Le Cœur des hommes 2, film by Marc Esposito. 
 2009 : LOL, film by Lisa Azuelos.
 2010 : The Round Up, film by Rose Bosch
 2010 to now: Clem, TV series by Joyce Buñuel
 2012 : L'Homme de ses rêves, telefilm by Christophe Douchand
 2014 : Joséphine, ange gardien, episode 69 : "Double Foyer"

See also 

 Lycée Paul-Valéry

References

External links 
 Le site internet du lycée
 Le site internet de l'amicale des anciens du lycée

Jean baptiste say
Jean baptiste say